Suresh Gopi is an Indian actor who has predominantly acted in Malayalam films, besides occasional appearances in Tamil, Telugu, Kannada and Hindi films.

Malayalam films

Other language films

As a playback singer

Television

References

External links
 Official Website
 

Indian filmographies
Male actor filmographies